The St. Maries River Railroad  is a shortline Class III railroad that operates 71 miles of freight service in northern Idaho.  From 1980 until 2010, it was a subsidiary of Potlatch Corp.

History and Trackage 

The St. Maries River Railroad began service on May 23, 1980, over trackage that previously had been owned by the bankrupt (and now-defunct) Chicago, Milwaukee, St. Paul & Pacific Railroad, also known as the Milwaukee Road.

The St. Maries River operates between Plummer, Idaho and St. Maries, Idaho on what was the Milwaukee Road's Pacific Northwest main line across the Rockies.  The railroad also operated on the Milwaukee Road's former Elk River branch line between St. Maries and Bovill, Idaho.

For several years from 1980 until the mid-1980s, Potlatch also owned and operated 45 miles of adjoining former Milwaukee Road trackage, between St. Maries and Avery, Idaho, as a private logging railroad that connected with the St. Maries River Railroad.  The federal government condemned the logging line between St. Maries and Avery in the mid-1980s, prompting its shutdown.

In 2010, Potlatch sold the St. Maries River Railroad for $1.6 million to Mike Williams of the Missouri-based Williams Group, which owns other short line railroads in Idaho, Missouri and South Dakota, including the BG&CM Railroad.

The St. Maries River Railroad connects with the Union Pacific Railroad at Plummer. The line to Bovill, ID is no longer in service as the connecting Washington and Idaho Railway line has been abandoned between Bovill and Harvard, ID.

Rolling Stock 
The railroad operates three EMD GP9 locomotives numbered 25287, 25296, and 25317, and two SW1200 switchers numbered 18762 and 20053 all formerly owned by the Chicago, Milwaukee, St. Paul & Pacific Railroad.

References 

Idaho railroads
Spin-offs of the Chicago, Milwaukee, St. Paul and Pacific Railroad
Railway companies established in 1980
1980 establishments in Idaho